Hold Me, Thrill Me, Kiss Me is the fifth studio solo album and first cover album released by American singer Gloria Estefan, but is the 17th overall, released in October 1994.

Content
The album features cover versions of songs which had a special meaning to Estefan, including songs from classic artists such as Carole King, Elton John, Neil Sedaka, The Moments, Vicki Sue Robinson, Blood, Sweat & Tears, The Classics IV, among others.

Critical reception
Music & Media wrote, "Caramba, coveritis has hit the Estefan estate. For every mood there's a song, but mainly for the late night wine-and-dine atmosphere. 'Don't Let The Sun Catch You Crying' feels like the kind of moonlit drama, the original singers Gerry & The Pace Makers intended it to be. The European bonus track 'Don't Let The Sun Go Down On Me' by you know who, only intensifies the romance which is in the air. Sometimes the tempo goes up like on the Blood, Sweat & Tears song 'You've Made Me So Very Happy.' For the single 'Turn The Beat Around'–an old '70s disco hit by Vicki Sue Robinson–she has even polished her Miami Sound Machine dancing shoes."

Track listing

Personnel
Adapted from AllMusic.

 Donna Allen – guest artist, background vocals
 Marcelo Añez – assistant engineer
 Randy Barlow – trumpet
 Edwin Bonilla – percussion
 Stony Browder – arranger
 Cachao, Frank Cornelius – bass guitar
 Charles Calello – arranger
 Ed Calle – guest artist, tenor saxophone
 Scott Canto – assistant engineer
 Jorge Casas – arranger, bass guitar, mandocello, programming
 Sean Chambers – assistant engineer
 Charles Christopher, Rick Krive, Rita Quintero, Joy Francis, LaGaylia Frazier – background vocals
 Mike Couzzi – engineer
 Paquito D'Rivera – clarinet
 Lawrence Dermer – arranger, fender rhodes, piano, programming, tambourine, background vocals
 Nancy Donald – art direction
 Emilio Estefan, Jr. – accordion, producer
 Gloria Estefan – primary artist, background vocals
 Hector Garrido – conductor, orchestration
 Andy Goldman – guitar
 Berry Gordy, Jr.
 Mark Gruber – assistant engineer
 Jim Hacker – trumpet
 Lauren Hammock – French horn
 Al Kooper – arranger
 Sebastián Krys – assistant engineer
 Patrice Levinson – engineer
 Andrew Lewinter – French horn
 Gary Lindsay, Whit Sidener – alto saxophone
 Fred Lipsius – arranger
 Bob Ludwig – mastering
 Juan R. Marquez, Andy Goldman, Tim Mitchell – guitar
 Teddy Mulet, Dana Teboe – trombone
 Clay Ostwald – arranger, Hammond organ, piano, programming
 Scott Perry – engineer
 Steve Robillar – assistant engineer
 Steve Rucker – drums
 Eric Schilling – engineer, mixing
 Nathaniel Seidman – arranger, programming
 Cindy Sluka – English horn, oboe
 Ted Stein – engineer
 Ron Taylor – engineer
 Alberto Tolot – photography
 Nestor Torres – flute
 Yvonne Yedibalian – assistant engineer

Chart positions

Weekly charts

Year-end charts

Certifications

Accolades

Release history

References

External links

Gloria Estefan Discography Database

1994 albums
Covers albums
Gloria Estefan albums
Albums produced by Emilio Estefan
Epic Records albums